Bloomsbury is a ward in the London Borough of Camden, in the United Kingdom. It covers much of the historic area of Bloomsbury, and also some of Covent Garden and Fitzrovia.

The ward has existed since the creation of the borough on 1 April 1965 and was first used in the 1964 elections, although its boundaries have evolved significantly over time, meaning that it no longer reflects the historical boundaries of Bloomsbury. Since 1983, the ward has been in the Holborn and St Pancras constituency, having previously been in Holborn and St Pancras South. It elects three councillors to Camden council, currently all held by the Labour Party, with an election every four years. In 2018, the ward had an electorate of 8,318. The Boundary Commission projects the electorate to rise to 8,541 by 2025.

Geography 
The Bloomsbury ward is one of Camden's most densely populated wards, while also comprising the highest proportion of commercial and institutional uses.  It is bordered to the west by Westminster City Council, to the south by the Holborn and Covent Garden ward, and to the east by the King's Cross ward. Its northern boundary is defined by the major Euston Road.

The ward encompasses much of the historic area of Bloomsbury, including most of its well-preserved surviving Georgian development in the west. This area is dense in land use and population, with a large proportion of institutional and commercial uses reflecting its Central London location. The premises of University College London comprises a large part of this ward, along with its various student housing blocks, while the commercial centre of Tottenham Court Road runs down the centre from north to south.

All of Camden's portion of Fitzrovia also falls within the Bloomsbury ward, leading some to confuse this area with Bloomsbury itself. This area is less densely developed, largely retaining its original Georgian character, with a large proportion of residential uses. The mixed-use commercial and residential centres of Charlotte Street and Goodge Street also fall within this area.

Electorate 
Due to the presence of University College London, and its numerous student halls of residence through this ward, a large proportion of the electorate comprises students who traditionally vote for Labour.

Much of the ward comprises large housing developments, including housing blocks and tower blocks. However due to an increase in the use of short-letting platforms such an AirBnb, an increasingly large proportion of residents live in Camden for less than three years at a time, meaning that they are less likely to vote. This means that turnout is especially low in this ward, with elected councillors only winning about 15% of the available vote.

Boundary revisions 
The Bloomsbury ward was created with the institution of the London Borough of Camden on 1 April 1965. The ward saw a revision of its boundaries in 1978, and a further revision in 2002. The ward will undergo boundary changes 2022 election. Areas in the Holborn and Covent Garden and King's Cross wards were transferred to the Bloomsbury ward.

Current councillors

Elections

Elections in the 2020s

Elections in the 2010s

Elections in the 2000s

References

External links 
 Bloomsbury Conservatives
 Bloomsbury Greens
 Bloomsbury Labour
 Bloomsbury Liberal Democrats

Wards of the London Borough of Camden
1965 establishments in England